Following is a list of senators of Orne, people who have represented the department of Orne in the Senate of France.

Third Republic

Senators for Orne under the French Third Republic were:

 Alfred de Flers (1876–1883)
 Léon de La Sicotière (1876–1895)
 Charles Poriquet (1876–1910)
 Marcel Libert (1885–1892)
 Léon Labbé (1892–1916)
 Paul Fleury (1895–1931)
 Louis Cachet (1910–1914)
 Robert Leneveu (1920–1927)
 Alfred Oriot (1920–1927)
 Georges Dentu (1927–1940)
 Alexandre Millerand (1927–1940)
 René de Ludre-Frolois (1931–1940)

Fourth Republic

Senators for Orne under the French Fourth Republic were:

 Raymond Le Terrier (1946–1948)
 Étienne Le Sassier Boisauné (1946–1948 et de 1952–1959)
 Pierre Couinaud (1948–1951)
 Marcel Hébert (1948–1952)
 Gaston Meillon (1951–1952) and (1956–1959)
 René Laniel (1952–1956)

Fifth Republic 
Senators for Orne under the French Fifth Republic were:

 Paul Pelleray (1959–1974)
 Étienne Le Sassier Boisauné (1959–1965)
 Hubert d'Andigné (1965–1992)
 Henri Olivier (1974–1992)
 Daniel Goulet (1992–2007)
 Alain Lambert (1992–2002 et de 2004–2010)
 Brigitte Luypaert (2002–2004)
 Jean-Claude Lenoir (2011–2017)

As of January 2018 the senators were:

References

Sources

 
Lists of members of the Senate (France) by department